Mass media in Guinea-Bissau includes print, radio, television, and the Internet. "The Conselho Nacional de Comunicação Social regulates the press." The government-run Guinea-Bissau National Radio began in 1973 and Guinea-Bissau Television began in 1987.

Radio

 Guinea-Bissau National Radio
 Radio Bafata
 Rádio Bombolom
 Rádio Jovem
 Radio Mavegro
 Radio Nacional
 Radio Pindjiguiti
 Radio Sintcha Oco
 Rádio Sol Mansi

Television

 Guinea-Bissau Television (TGB)
 RTP África
 TV Klélé (est. 2013)

Publications
Print and online publications include:
 Banobero
 Bissau Digital
 
 Comdev Negocios
 Correio-Bissau
 Diario de Bissau
 Expresso de Bissau
 Fraskera
 Gazeta de Noticias
 Kansare
 Nô Pintcha
 Ultima Hora
 Voz de Bissau
 Wandan

See also
 Telecommunications in Guinea-Bissau
 
 Telephone numbers in Guinea-Bissau

References

Bibliography

External links
 

 
Guinea-Bissau
Guinea-Bissau